Ledger Ritson (28 April 1921 – March 1977) was an English professional footballer who played in the Football League for Leyton Orient as a left back. After retiring from football, he jointly coached and advised the Leyton Orient reserve and 'A' teams with Syd Hobbins.

Personal life 
Ritson served in the British Army during the Second World War. His football career was ended by a broken right leg, during a training run at Leyton Stadium in December 1949, while rehabilitating without his doctor's knowledge after having suffered a compound fracture to the same leg three months earlier. Gangrene set in and the leg was amputated in January 1950.

References 

English Football League players
English footballers
Association football fullbacks
Footballers from Gateshead
English amputees
1921 births
British Army personnel of World War II
Hitchin Town F.C. players
Leyton Orient F.C. players
Leyton Orient F.C. non-playing staff
1977 deaths
Association footballers with limb difference
English disabled sportspeople